Dry Hill is a  nature preserve in New Marlborough, Massachusetts and is managed by the Trustees of Reservations, who acquired the land in 2000. It includes a  hiking trail of medium to strenuous difficulty.

References

External links 
 The Trustees of Reservations: Dry Hill
 Trail map

The Trustees of Reservations
Open space reserves of Massachusetts
Protected areas of Berkshire County, Massachusetts
New Marlborough, Massachusetts
2000 establishments in Massachusetts
Protected areas established in 2000